Hickman County is a county located in the U.S. state of Tennessee. As of the 2020 Census, the population was 24,925. Its county seat is Centerville. Hickman County was part of the Nashville–Davidson–Murfreesboro–Franklin, TN Metropolitan Statistical Area but was removed in September 2018.

History

Hickman County was named for Edwin Hickman, an explorer and surveyor who was killed in an Indian attack at Defeated Creek in 1791.

The county was established in 1807, and named for Hickman at the suggestion of Robert Weakley, a legislator who had been a member of Hickman's surveying party. The original county was vast, extending to the southern border of the state. Hickman County was reduced in extent when it partially contributed to the formations of four counties: Wayne and Lawrence Counties in 1817, Perry County in 1819, and Lewis County in 1843.

Hickman and the Duck River valley was originally claimed by the Chickasaw people of western Tennessee and northern Mississippi. Among its first white settlers was John Gordon, the famous "Captain of the Spies" who later fought at Horseshoe Bend and at Pensacola under Andrew Jackson.

Gordon acquired land in Chickasaw territory in what is now Hickman County on the banks of the Duck River, where, in a partnership with Chief William "Chooshemataha" Colbert, he operated a ferry and Indian trading post for settlers traveling on the Natchez Trace.

The trace was a war-path later made into a federal road for settlers moving from Tennessee to the lower Mississippi territory. The Chickasaw ceded the land to Tennessee in 1805 and Gordon kept the estate, moving his family there in 1812 and eventually amassing a plantation of over 1500 acres. The Gordon House still stands by the Duck River today, now maintained by the Natchez Trace National Parkway. Throughout the 19th century, the county's industry revolved around iron furnaces, which made use of the county's natural supply of high-quality iron ore.

Early furnaces included Napier's furnace near Aetna, which was destroyed by Union soldiers during the Civil War, and furnaces built by the Standard Coal Company in the 1880s.

Hickman natives include songwriter Beth Slater Whitson and Grand Ole Opry personality Minnie Pearl. William F. Lyell was a corporal in the United States Army during the Korean War. He was posthumously awarded the Medal of Honor for his actions on August 31, 1951.

The county is the subject of the Johnny Cash song "Saturday Night In Hickman County", and the Hickman community of Grinder's Switch is indirectly mentioned in the song, "The South's Gonna Do It Again", by the Charlie Daniels Band (one line refers to the band Grinderswitch, and their song "Right On Time").

Geography
The Duck River, the Piney River, and many creeks, large and small, run through Hickman County.

Adjacent counties
Dickson County (north)
Williamson County (east)
Maury County (southeast)
Lewis County (south)
Perry County (west)
Humphreys County (northwest)

National protected area
 Natchez Trace Parkway (part)

State protected areas
 Beaver Dam Creek Wildlife Management Area
 MTSU Wildlife Management Area
 John Noel State Natural Area

Demographics

2020 census

As of the 2020 United States census, there were 24,925 people, 8,636 households, and 5,611 families residing in the county.

2000 census
As of the census of 2000, there were 22,295 people, 8,081 households, and 5,955 families residing in the county. The population density was 36 people per square mile (14/km2). There were 8,904 housing units at an average density of 14 per square mile (6/km2). The racial makeup of the county was 93.71% White, 4.53% Black or African American, 0.48% Native American, 0.08% Asian, 0.01% Pacific Islander, 0.29% from other races, and 0.90% from two or more races. 1.00% of the population were Hispanic or Latino of any race.

There were 8,081 households, out of which 33.90% had children under the age of 18 living with them, 59.40% were married couples living together, 9.60% had a female householder with no husband present, and 26.30% were non-families. 22.60% of all households were made up of individuals, and 9.90% had someone living alone who was 65 years of age or older. The average household size was 2.59 and the average family size was 3.02.

In the county, the population was spread out, with 24.70% under the age of 18, 8.50% from 18 to 24, 31.00% from 25 to 44, 23.80% from 45 to 64, and 12.00% who were 65 years of age or older. The median age was 36 years. For every 100 females, there were 112.50 males. For every 100 females age 18 and over, there were 111.50 males.

The median income for a household in the county was $31,013, and the median income for a family was $36,342. Males had a median income of $29,411 versus $21,185 for females. The per capita income for the county was $14,446.  About 11.60% of families and 14.30% of the population were below the poverty line, including 15.90% of those under age 18 and 18.40% of those age 65 or over.

Communities

Town
Centerville

Census-designated places
Bon Aqua Junction
Lyles
Wrigley

Unincorporated communities

 Aetna
 Bon Aqua
 Bond
 Bucksnort
 Buffalo
 Goodrich
 Grinder's Switch
 Littlelot
 Nunnelly
 Only
 Pleasantville
 Primm Springs
 Shady Grove
 Swan Bluff
 Whitfield

Politics

See also
National Register of Historic Places listings in Hickman County, Tennessee

References

External links

 Official site
 Hickman County, TNGenWeb – free genealogy resources for the county

 
1807 establishments in Tennessee
Populated places established in 1807
Middle Tennessee